The Limes Railway is a continuously electrified and single-track railway that runs on the southern edge of the Taunus in the German state of Hesse, connecting the towns of Niederhöchstadt and Bad Soden am Taunus. It is named after Limesstadt (Limes city), a housing development.

The line is only 5.2 kilometres long and is served by S-Bahn line S3, connecting Bad Soden station—which is a terminus also used by the Soden Railway—via Frankfurt (Main) Hauptbahnhof to Darmstadt Hbf.

Past and Present 
Beginning in 1964 a large greenfield housing development was built on the outskirts of Schwalbach am Taunus called Limesstadt (Limes City, named after the Roman fortifications of the Limes Germanicus, which actually lay more than 10 kilometres north of this site).  It was considered that this development needed the kind of public transport access that could only be provided by rail. This idea was adopted by Georg Leber, the Federal Minister for Transport from 1966 to 1972 and the local member of the Bundestag. This led to the building of an electrified branch line to serve the area.

On 22 December 1970, a shuttle service opened between Niederhöchstadt station on the Kronberg Railway and the new Schwalbach Limes station. On 6 November 1972, the gap was closed to Bad Soden (Taunus) station, which until then was only connected by the Soden Railway to Frankfurt-Höchst.

On 28 May 1978 the line began to be used by S-Bahn line S3, initially to Hauptwache.

Schwalbach North 
Since 31 October 2008, S3 services have served Schwalbach Nord station. This is located between the Schwalbach Limes and Niederhöchstadt stations and serves the industrial park of Am Kronberger Hang in Schwalbach am Taunus. The station consists of a 210-metre-long  platform and is barrier-free.

The estimated construction cost of the new station was €1.5 million  and planning costs amounted to €300,000.

References

Railway lines in Hesse
Taunus
railway lines opened in 1970
1970 establishments in West Germany
Rhine-Main S-Bahn